Zanclopteryx uniferata is a moth of the family Geometridae first described by Francis Walker in 1863. It is found in South America and Central America, as well as on the Bahamas and Jamaica.

References

Moths described in 1897
Oenochrominae